John Gordon "Jack" Ingoldsby (June 21, 1924 – August 10, 1982) was a Canadian professional ice hockey player. He played 29 games in the National Hockey League with the Toronto Maple Leafs from 1942 to 1944. In 1924, he weighed 210 at 6'2". Ingoldsby retired from playing hockey in 1960 and died in Oakville, Ontario on August 10, 1982 at the age of 58.

Career
In 1941 and 1942, Ingoldsby played Junior B Hockey for De La Salle Academy in Toronto. On November 18, 1942, he was signed as a free agent by Toronto. In 1943, he played the following season at two schools; half at the Providence Rds and Toronto Maple Leafs. By the end of 1943 and through 1944, he had returned to De La Salle Academy. The 29 games, of which his career in the NHL consisted, were for the Leafs where he accumulated five goals and one assist.

Later, Ingoldsby played senior hockey for the Toronto Staffords in 1945 and 1946. Immediately after, from 1947 till 1953, he played for the Owen Sound Mercurys. He won the Allan Cup with the Mercurys in 1951.

In 1953 he played in the International Hockey League and the Eastern Hockey League and moved to the minor pros. Jack Ingoldsby retired in 1960.

Career statistics

Regular season and playoffs

Awards
 Allan Cup - 1951

References

External links
 

1924 births
1982 deaths
Canadian ice hockey right wingers
Charlotte Checkers (EHL) players
Grand Rapids Rockets players
Huntington Hornets players
Marion Barons players
New Haven Blades players
Ontario Hockey Association Senior A League (1890–1979) players
Providence Reds players
Ice hockey people from Toronto
Toronto Maple Leafs players